The 1987–88 season was Port Vale's 76th season of football in the English Football League, and second successive (17th overall) season in the Third Division. John Rudge's side started the season well, but then suffered following the sale of star striker Andy Jones. Just as Rudge seemed to be struggling, the Vale earned a memorable 2–1 victory over top-flight Tottenham Hotspur at Vale Park in the FA Cup Fourth Round. They exited the competition at the next stage at the hands of Watford, following a replay. Vale's league form also improved, as they finished in eleventh place, helped by midfielders Ray Walker and Robbie Earle, defenders Phil Sproson and Bob Hazell, and goalkeeper Mark Grew. Darren Beckford and David Riley were joint-top-scorers with ten goals each. Vale exited the League Cup and the Associate Members' Cup at the First Round.

Overview

Third Division
The pre-season saw Russell Bromage traded to Bristol City in exchange for Lawrie Pearson and £25,000. Jon Bowden was also sold to Wrexham for £12,500. The club also announced a new sponsorship deal with ABC Minolta, whilst the English Football League announced that midweek games would be played on Monday nights instead of Tuesday nights. John Rudge bought Darren Beckford from Manchester City for £15,000.

The season began with Andy Jones scoring all four goals in his 100th appearance for the club, to beat Aldershot 4–2. With Pearson performing poorly, Darren Hughes was signed from Brighton & Hove Albion for a £10,000 fee. Paul Smith was also offloaded to Lincoln City for £40,000. Vale then won three consecutive games to go top of the table. After goal machine Andy Jones was sold to First Division Charlton Athletic for £350,000 – a sale Rudge described as like 'cutting off my right arm' – Vale slid down the table. Alex Williams was also forced to retire with a back injury, leading to the return of a fit again Mark Grew in goal. More injuries came as Chris Banks had his nose broken after a reserve match at Barnsley when he was attacked by a gang of youths whilst waiting at a fish and chip shop. Alan Webb then suffered second degree burns at Preston North End's plastic pitch at Deepdale. The next month Rudge tried to replace Jones when he signed David Riley from Nottingham Forest for £20,000. Despite a good start Riley soon entered a goal drought, as Vale went twelve league games without a win (including eight defeats). Robbie Earle missed much of this period with a hernia injury. In November Kevin Steggles was signed from West Bromwich Albion for 'a small fee' to replace the still-injured Webb. More signings were made with former England international Peter Barnes arriving on loan from Manchester City, and 'hard-working' Simon Mills purchased from York City for £35,000.

Rumours of a Rudge exit from Vale Park came after Alan Oakes quit in protest after being demoted to youth coach, and 'taskmaster' Mike Pejic was promoted in his place. Nevertheless, he signed Gary Ford from Leicester City for £36,000, whilst Pearson had his contract cancelled by mutual consent. Michael Cole also arrived on loan from Ipswich Town. Rudge switched from a formation of 4–4–2 to 4–3–3 and only one defeat followed in the next thirteen league games. As Barnes returned to Manchester, Richard O'Kelly was transferred to Walsall. Cole was replaced by another loanee Dean Holdsworth (from Watford), who found greater success with Vale. However Gary Hamson was forced to retire through injury. A 5–0 win over Doncaster Rovers on 2 April helped the Vale into tenth place, giving Vale a faint hope of reaching the play-offs. Vale ended the season poorly however, winning just two of their final nine games.

They finished in eleventh place with 65 points, ten points short of play-off contenders Bristol City. Top-scorers Beckford and Riley had managed ten goals each, just four more than Jones had done in his eight games. Ray Walker was honoured with the club's Player of the Year award and was selected for the PFA's Third Division team of the year.

Finances
On the financial side, the cup run and sale of Jones had raised a record profit of £410,239. Match receipts had increased by 67% to £380,387, whilst advertising and broadcast revenues had more than doubled to £157,861. The club's shirt sponsors were ABC Minolta Copiers. The wage bill had also fallen to £367,836. Three players were given free transfers at the season's end: Kevin Steggles (Bury Town), Chris Banks (Exeter City), and Paul Maguire (Northwich Victoria).

Cup competitions
In the FA Cup, Vale put in their 'worst away performance of the season' in a 2–2 draw at Prenton Park. They managed to beat Tranmere Rovers 3–1 in the replay in Burslem. A 'splendid' performance then defeated Notts County 2–0. They overcame non-league Macclesfield Town with a Kevin Finney goal to book a Fourth Round home tie with Tottenham Hotspur. Ground improvements increased Vale Park's capacity, though a watered down pitch persuaded "Spurs" boss Terry Venables to leave star man Osvaldo Ardiles on the bench. Despite this, TV pundit Jimmy Greaves reckoned that "The only trouble Spurs will have at Port Vale, is finding the place." As it happened 20,045 turned up to witness a 'famous' 2–1 victory. The "Valiants" were in 'another gear' as Ray Walker nailed a 'stunning' 25 yard strike and Phil Sproson scored the second vital goal. The club received £80,000 for the game from the BBC, with the match also broadcast on radio in Australia. The Fourth Round held Watford, and 22,483 turned up for the original goalless tie in Stoke-on-Trent (the highest Vale Park attendance since the visit of Liverpool in 1964). A further £87,699 was taken from the game. At the replay at Vicarage Road Vale were eliminated 2–0, though Vale were delighted with their £175,000 winning cup run.

In the League Cup, 3,460 saw Vale's opening tie with Northampton Town fail 'to produce the passion of a schoolyard kickabout', though both sides had two players sent off in the 2–0 defeat. Vale were then thumped 4–0 at Sixfields to exit the tournament 6–0 on aggregate.

In the Associate Members' Cup, Fourth Division strugglers Newport County beat the Vale 2–0 at Somerton Park, though a 2–0 home win over Exeter City took the Vale through the group stage. They then were eliminated by Torquay United at Plainmoor with a 1–0 loss.

League table

Results
Port Vale's score comes first

Football League Third Division

Results by matchday

Matches

FA Cup

League Cup

Associate Members' Cup

Player statistics

Appearances

Top scorers

Transfers

Transfers in

Transfers out

Loans in

References
Specific

General

Port Vale F.C. seasons
Port Vale